Lucy Jane Carpenter  (born 21 October 1969) is professor of physical chemistry at the University of York and director of the Cape Verde Atmospheric Observatory (CVAO).

Education
Carpenter graduated with a BSc in Chemistry from the University of Bristol in 1991 followed by a PhD in atmospheric chemistry at the University of East Anglia supervised by Stuart Penkett and awarded in 1996.

Research and career
Her group studies the complex interaction between the oceans and the atmosphere, in particular the chemistry of reactive halogens, organic carbon, and reactive nitrogen.  Her work on oceanic and atmospheric halogens has established this chemistry as an important component of tropospheric ozone cycling and makes use of gas chromatography–mass spectrometry (GCMS).

She helped establish the Cape Verde Atmospheric Observatory, one of a few dozen World Meteorological Organization (WMO) Global Atmosphere Watch (GAW) stations worldwide which monitor climate and air quality gases over long time scales, and was a lead chapter author of the WMO/United Nations Environment Programme (UNEP) 2014 scientific assessment of ozone depletion.

Awards and honours
Carpenter has received several awards for her research. She received a Philip Leverhulme Prize in 'Earth Ocean and Atmospheric Sciences' in 2006, and was given the Rosalind Franklin Award from the Royal Society in 2015 for "her scientific achievement, her suitability as a role model and her project proposal to promote women in STEM". She received the Tilden Prize in 2017. In 2019, Carpenter was elected a Fellow of the Royal Society (FRS).

Carpenter was appointed Member of the Order of the British Empire (MBE) in the 2022 New Year Honours for services to atmospheric chemistry.

References

1969 births
Living people
Alumni of the University of Bristol
Alumni of the University of East Anglia
Academics of the University of York
21st-century British chemists
21st-century British women scientists
British women chemists
Fellows of the Royal Society
Female Fellows of the Royal Society
Members of the Order of the British Empire